This is a list of notable current and former members of the Socialist Party of Great Britain.  Where available, their term of membership is indicated.

A. S. Albery (1904)
E. J. B. Allen (1904–1906)
Alexander Anderson (1904–1926)
Moses Baritz
Robert Barltrop 
Dan Billany (1931–1933)
John Bird (1950s)
Adam Buick (1962–)
F. K. Cadman (1904–after 1931)
Jim D'Arcy (1943-1991)
Jack Fitzgerald (1904–1929)
R. M. Fox
Alec Gray (1904–after 1911)
Edgar Hardcastle (1922–1991)
Horace Hawkins (1904–1905)
George Hicks (1904, 1908–1910)
Thomas A. Jackson (1904–1909)
Albert E. Jacomb (1904–1942)
Jack Kent (1904–1908)
Con Lehane (1904–1906)
Joan Lestor
Henry Martin (1904–1905, 1908–1911)
Cyril May (1940-1991)
Valentine McEntee (1904–1905)
Hans Neumann (1904–1911)
John Rowan
David Ramsay Steele (1960s)
George Walford
Laurie Weidberg
Harry Young (1940–1991)

References

Socialist Party of Great Britain